Luis Cerrilla (1 February 1906 – 14 October 1936) was a Mexican footballer. He competed in the men's tournament at the 1928 Summer Olympics.

References

External links
 
 

1906 births
1936 deaths
Mexico international footballers
Olympic footballers of Mexico
Footballers at the 1928 Summer Olympics
Footballers from Mexico City
Association football midfielders
Club América footballers
Mexican footballers